Acyl-CoA dehydrogenase family member 9, mitochondrial is an enzyme that in humans is encoded by the ACAD9 gene. Mitochondrial Complex I Deficiency with varying clinical manifestations has been associated with mutations in ACAD9.

Structure 

The ACAD9 gene contains an open reading frame of 1866 base pairs; this gene encodes a protein with 621 amino acid residues. Alignment of the ACAD9 protein sequence with that of other human ACAD proteins showed that ACAD-9 protein displays 46–27% identity, and 56–38% similarity with the eight members of the ACAD family, including ACADVL, ACADS, ACADM, ACADL, IVD, GCD, ACADSB, and ACD8. The calculated molecular weight of the ACAD9 is 68.8 kDa.

Function 

The ACAD9 enzyme catalyzes a crucial step in fatty acid beta-oxidation by forming a C2-C3 trans-double bond in the fatty acid. LVCAD is specific to very long-chain fatty acids, typically C16-acylCoA and longer. It has been observed that ACAD9 can catalyze acyl-CoAs with very long chains. The specific activity of ACAD9 towards palmitoyl-CoA (C16:0) is three times higher than that towards stearoyl-CoA (C18:0). ACAD-9 has little activity on n-octanoyl-CoA (C8:0), n-butyryl-CoA (C4:0) or isovaleryl-CoA (C5:0).

In contrast with ACADVL, ACAD9 is also involved in assembly of the oxidative phosphorylation complex I. ACAD9 binds complex I assembly factors NDUFAF1 and Ecsit and is specifically required for the assembly of complex I. Furthermore, ACAD9 mutations result in complex I deficiency and not in disturbed long-chain fatty acid oxidation.

Clinical significance 

Mutations in the ACAD9 gene are associated with mitochondrial complex I deficiency type 20, which is autosomal recessive. This deficiency is the most common enzymatic defect of the oxidative phosphorylation disorders. Mitochondrial complex I deficiency shows extreme genetic heterogeneity and can be caused by mutation in nuclear-encoded genes or in mitochondrial-encoded genes. There are no obvious genotype–phenotype correlations, and inference of the underlying basis from the clinical or biochemical presentation is difficult, if not impossible. However, the majority of cases are caused by mutations in nuclear-encoded genes. It causes a wide range of clinical disorders, ranging from lethal neonatal disease to adult-onset neurodegenerative disorders. Phenotypes include macrocephaly with progressive leukodystrophy, nonspecific encephalopathy, hypertrophic cardiomyopathy, myopathy, liver disease, Leigh syndrome, Leber hereditary optic neuropathy, and some forms of Parkinson disease.

A few cases specific to ACAD9 have been reported. Some cases presented with episodic liver dysfunction during otherwise mild illnesses or cardiomyopathy, along with chronic neurologic dysfunction. Brain findings were notable for generalized edema with diffuse ventricular compression, acute left tonsillar herniation, and diffuse multifocal acute damage in the hippocampus. In addition, some abnormalities consistent with nonacute changes were seen, including a subacute right cerebellar hemispheric infarct and reduction in the number of neurons in several areas. In one patient, whose clinical manifestations of hypotonia, cardiomyopathy, and lactic acidosis, a vigorous treatment with riboflavin allowed the individual to have normal psychomotor development and no cognitive impairment at 5 years of age. Exercise-induced rhabdomyolysis, mitochondrial encephalomyopathy, and hyperplasia in liver, cardiac myocytes, skeletal muscle, and renal tubules have also been observed in patients with ACAD9 mutations.

Interactions 

ACAD9 is part of the mitochondrial complex I assembly (MCIA) complex. The complex comprises at least TMEM126B, NDUFAF1, ECSIT, and ACAD9, which interacts directly with NDUFAF1 and ECSIT.

References

External links

Further reading 

 
 
 
 
 
 

Human proteins